Senait Fisseha (born 1971) is an Ethiopian endocrinologist at University of Michigan working with  reproductive endocrinology and infertility and director of international programs at the Susan Buffet Foundation. Fisseha has a J.D. degree and is known for her work as an advocate for global reproductive health, rights and gender equality. She is the founder of the Center for International Reproductive Health Training (CIRHT) at the University of Michigan. She chaired the election campaign of Tedros Adhanom, the first African Director General of the World Health Organization, in 2016-17.

Early life and education 
Born in Addis Ababa, Ethiopia in 1971, Fisseha was the third youngest of ten siblings. Unlike her older siblings who were interested in engineering and physics, Senait demonstrated a passion for medicine from a very young age. 

After completing high school, Fisseha briefly studied at Tikur Anbessa (Black Lion Medical School) in Addis Ababa. In 1989, she traveled to the United States, enrolled at Rosary College (now Dominican University), and earned a Bachelor of Science degree. Subsequently, she received Howard Hughes Medical Institute funding to pursue research at the University of Michigan. While at the University of Michigan, Senait developed new interests in the field of medical malpractice, specifically in the fields of obstetrics and gynecology. This, combined with an interest in international women's health and women's rights, led to pursuit of a joint Juris Doctor (J.D.)/Doctor of Medicine (M.D.) program. Senait earned a J.D./M.D. degree from Southern Illinois University in 1999 with honors, and was inducted into the Alpha Omega Alpha honor society. She completed a residency in obstetrics and gynaecology in 2003, and a fellowship in reproductive endocrinology and infertility in 2006, at the University of Michigan medical center.

Career 
Fisseha's work has centered on improving global women's health. After the completion of her fellowship at the University of Michigan, she joined the institution as junior faculty and later earned a tenure track position, which resulted in a full professorship. In her time at the University of Michigan, Fisseha has been appointed to various academic and administrative positions. She has served as the medical director of Michigan's Center for Reproductive Medicine, chief of division for reproductive endocrinology & infertility, and as the co-director of the medical school's Path of Excellence in Global Health & Disparities.

Fisseha led the creation of the Center for International Reproductive Health Training (CIRHT) at the University of Michigan and held the title of founding executive director of the center until 2015. The CIRHT was founded to serve as a collaboration platform for University of Michigan faculty and faculty from medical institutions in sub-Saharan Africa and South East Asia where the reported maternal mortality rates are high. The goal of the center is to alleviate the burden of maternal mortality and to promote reproductive health and reproductive justice in these regions. Senate played a key role in founding the center and as a facilitator of the collaboration between her colleges at the University of Michigan and faculty at medical institutions in her native Ethiopia.

Fisseha secured a $25 million grant to pilot the CIRHT program with St. Paul's Hospital Millennium Medical College (SPHMMC) in Addis Ababa. As part of the partnership, a pre-service training module was developed for the physicians, nurses, and midwives. After the successful first implementations of the module in SPHMMC, it was adopted by nine other institutions in the country.

Fisseha was appointed as the director of International Programs at the Buffett Foundation in 2015, where she oversees international grant making and continues to advocate for global reproductive justice. 

In 2017, Fisseha chaired the campaign and transition of the director-general of the World Health Organization, Tedros Adhanom Ghebreyesus, the first African elected director-general of WHO. She later served as his Chief Adviser.

Since 2019, Fisseha has been a member of the Lancet–SIGHT Commission on Peaceful Societies Through Health and Gender Equality, chaired by Tarja Halonen. In 2021, she was appointed to the WHO's Council on the Economics of Health For All, chaired by Mariana Mazzucato. Since 2022, she has been a member of the Commission for Universal Health convened by Chatham House and co-chaired by Helen Clark and Jakaya Kikwete.

Other activities
Over her career, Senait has been part of various associations and fellowships including the American Society of Reproductive Medicine (ASRM), European Society for Human Reproduction and Embryology (ESHRE), American College of Legal Medicine (ACLM), Norman F. Miller Gynecologic Society, American Congress of Obstetricians and Gynecologist and American Association of Ultrasound Medicine (AAUM). 

In addition, Senait holds the following positions:
 Exemplars in Global Health, Member of the Senior Advisory Board (since 2020)
 Global Health 50/50, Member of the Advisory Council (since 2018)
 Harvard Ministerial Leadership Program (of Harvard T.H. Chan School of Public Health, Harvard Kennedy School of Government, and the Graduate School of Education), Member of the Advisory Board (since 2018)
 University of Global Health Equity (UGHE), Member of the Board of Directors (since 2015)
 Ethio-American Doctors Group, Director 
 Global Initiative for Better Health, Member of the Advisory Board 
 Hamlin Fistula Foundation, Member of the Board of Directors
 Willows Foundation for Reproductive Health (Istanbul, Turkey), Member of Board of Directors
 WomenLift Health, Member of the Global Advisory Board

Awards 
The Ethiopian Ministry of Health honored her with the highest award given in recognition of profound contribution to the health sector in 2013. In 2016, she received the early distinguished career achievement award from the University of Michigan medical center alumni society. She was also one of only 20 recipients of the University of Michigan Bicentennial Alumni Award for her "global leadership in expanding reproductive health services, especially in developing countries." The Association of Women in Business (AWiB) in Ethiopia has nominated her for the "Women of Excellence" award in 2016. She was also listed as one of the 100 most influential Africans of 2018 by the New Africa Magazine.

Publications 
Senait has published articles in the fields of reproductive endocrinology, infertility, and medical ethics. She conducts research on infertility, including the use of alternative medicine, the reproductive potential of cancer patients after chemotherapy, and postmenopausal reproduction.

Personal life 
Senait met her husband Tewodros Fesseha M.D., a Urology Robotic Surgeon, while she was conducting research at the University of Michigan. She is a mother of four children, three boys and a girl.

References 

1971 births
Living people
Women in medicine
Ethiopian women scientists
Advocates of women's reproductive rights
Ethiopian women's rights activists
Ethiopian women